Jeremy Robert Hellickson (born April 8, 1987) is an American former professional baseball pitcher. He played in Major League Baseball (MLB) for the Tampa Bay Rays, Arizona Diamondbacks, Philadelphia Phillies, Baltimore Orioles, and Washington Nationals. Following the 2011 season, Hellickson was named American League Rookie of the Year. In Tampa Bay, Hellickson was nicknamed "Hellboy" by local fans and media.

Early life
Hellickson was born in Des Moines, Iowa and attended Hoover High School.

Professional career

Minor leagues
Hellickson was drafted by Tampa Bay in the fourth round of the 2005 Major League Baseball draft. Baseball America rated him as the 18th best prospect in all of baseball going into the 2010 season. He was selected to play in the 2010 All-Star Futures Game and was the starting pitcher for U.S. team.

Tampa Bay Rays
On August 2, 2010, Hellickson made his major league debut against Minnesota Twins. During his debut, he held the Twins to two runs over seven innings. He struck out six while walking two. He was optioned back to the Triple-A Durham Bulls after the start. He was once again recalled to the majors on August 10 to take the spot of Wade Davis in the rotation. He made his second career start that day against the Detroit Tigers at Comerica Park, earning his second career victory after pitching seven shutout innings with three hits, seven strikeouts and no walks as the Rays won 8–0.

On August 21, 2010, Hellickson was optioned to the High-A Charlotte Stone Crabs to work on moving to the bullpen. He was recalled to Tampa Bay on September 1, and made his first appearance out of the bullpen on September 4, pitching 1 innings giving up 2 runs.

Hellickson began the 2011 season as the Rays fifth starter. On May 13, he threw his first complete game, earning a 3–0 victory over the Baltimore Orioles. Following the season, Hellickson earned the 2011 American League MLB Rookie of the Year Award. He was named the Rays third starter for the 2012 season and pitched 8 shutout innings against the New York Yankees on April 8, 2012.

Hellickson was the losing pitcher in Félix Hernández's perfect game on August 15, 2012.  He still had a quality start in the game, allowing one run and five hits over seven innings to the Seattle Mariners.

Hellickson was optioned to Charlotte on August 27. He was recalled from the Double-A Montgomery Biscuits on September 3 after the major league rosters expanded. He did not pitch for either minor league team.

He was named co-winner with Jake Peavy, then with the Chicago White Sox, of the American League Rawlings Gold Glove for 2012.

Arizona Diamondbacks
On November 14, 2014, the Rays traded Hellickson to the Arizona Diamondbacks for Andrew Velazquez and Justin Williams. He signed a one-year deal worth $4.275 million on January 16, 2015 and avoided arbitration. In 27 starts, he finished 9-12 with an ERA of 4.62 in 146 innings.

Philadelphia Phillies
On November 14, 2015, Hellickson was traded to the Philadelphia Phillies for minor league pitcher Sam McWilliams. On January 15, 2016, Hellickson signed a one-year deal for $7 million avoiding arbitration. Hellickson started for the Phillies on Opening Day. The Phillies extended Hellickson a qualifying offer worth $17.2 million for the 2017 season, which he accepted.

On April 3, 2017, Hellickson was the starting pitcher against the Cincinnati Reds on Opening Day. He hit his first-career triple, the first pitcher to hit a triple in the season opener since San Francisco Giants' Jack Sanford in 1963. He pitched five innings earning the win, allowing one run and six hits. He left early because of running the triple.

Baltimore Orioles
On July 28, 2017, the Phillies traded Hellickson to the Baltimore Orioles for Hyun-soo Kim and Garrett Cleavinger.

In his first start as an Oriole, Hellickson threw seven shutout innings against the Royals, striking out three batters while earning the win in a 6-0 victory. Despite that hot start, Hellickson struggled down the stretch, posting a 5.43 ERA over 30 starts over the course of the season. For the 2017 season, between the two teams he led the majors in giving up the most home runs per nine innings (1.92). He became a free agent following the conclusion of the season.

Washington Nationals
Hellickson signed a minor league contract with the Washington Nationals that included an invitation to major league spring training on March 17, 2018. His contract was selected on April 16 for a start against the New York Mets at Citi Field. In his Nationals debut, Hellickson worked into the fifth inning while giving up two runs, taking a no-decision as his team rallied in the eighth inning to win 8–6. He earned his first Nationals win on May 8, 2018, at PETCO Park, taking a perfect game bid into the seventh inning and allowing no runs in the two-hit outing, striking out eight San Diego Padres in the process. He began his tenure with Washington going 2-0 with a 2.28 ERA before landing on the disabled list with a hamstring strain. He ended the season with a 5-3 record in  innings.

On February 8, 2019, Hellickson re-signed with the Nationals, inking a one-year, $1.3 million contract with up to $4 million in incentives. In 9 appearances (8 starts) Hellickson went 2-3 with a 6.23 ERA before suffering a season-ending shoulder injury. The Nationals finished the 2019 year with a 93-69 record, clinching a wild card spot, and eventually went on to win the 2019 World Series over the Houston Astros, their first championship in franchise history. Although Hellickson did not participate in any postseason action, he won his first World Series championship.

Hellickson retired from baseball on February 14, 2020, after experiencing a shoulder setback prior to spring training.

Achievements
2009 Triple-A Baseball National Championship Most Valuable Player
Baseball America Minor League Player of the Year Award, 2010
International League Most Valuable Pitcher, 2010
USA Today Minor League Player of the Year Award, 2010
American League Rookie of the Month – May 2011
American League Pitcher of the Month – May 2011
American League Rookie of the Year Award, 2011
2019 World Series champion

Personal life
Hellickson and his wife Natalie reside in West Des Moines, Iowa.

See also

 List of Major League Baseball single-inning strikeout leaders
 List of Philadelphia Phillies Opening Day starting pitchers

References

External links

1987 births
Living people
Baseball players from Des Moines, Iowa
Major League Baseball pitchers
Major League Baseball Rookie of the Year Award winners
Gold Glove Award winners
Tampa Bay Rays players
Arizona Diamondbacks players
Philadelphia Phillies players
Baltimore Orioles players
Washington Nationals players
Princeton Devil Rays players
Hudson Valley Renegades players
Columbus Catfish players
Vero Beach Devil Rays players
Montgomery Biscuits players
Durham Bulls players
Charlotte Stone Crabs players
American people of Swedish descent